Dunbar RFC is an amateur rugby club based in Dunbar, East Lothian. Founded in 1923 they play their homes games at Hallhill Healthy Living Centre, where they moved to in 2001 along with the local football team Dunbar United F.C. and the local hockey, running and squash clubs. They currently compete in the East Regional League Division Two.

History 
The club was founded by a group of like-minded gentleman commuters on the Dunbar-to-Edinburgh train. They set up a meeting on 16 November 1923 to formally announce the formation of the club, the first President (Dr. McLagan) and Captain (J.C. McCubbin).

Famous players 
Grahame Budge – Scotland & British Lions 1950 - the first tour played in what became the famous red jersey
Derek White – Dunbar, Haddington, Gala, Scotland, British Lions

External links 
 https://dunbarrugbyclub.com/

Scottish rugby union teams
Rugby union in East Lothian
Dunbar